Qalatak (also Romanized as Qalātak) is a village in Bahmai-ye Garmsiri-ye Shomali Rural District, Bahmai-ye Garmsiri District, Bahmai County, Kohgiluyeh and Boyer-Ahmad Province, Iran. At the 2006 census, its population was 63, in 13 families.

References 

Populated places in Bahmai County